Joan C. Steiner (October 10, 1943September 8, 2010) was an American illustrator and puzzle designer.

Biography
A graduate of Barnard College, she was the recipient of numerous art and design awards, including a Society of Illustrators Award and a National Endowment for the Arts fellowship.

Her first book, Super Look-Alikes, received glowing reviews and was featured on national television in the USA. Her second book, Amazing Look-Alikes, which was published by Walker Books, has over 700 everyday objects in disguise, ranging from paper clips to refrigerator magnets.

Steiner died of cancer on September 8, 2010, in her home in Claverack, New York, at the age of 66.

Publications 

 Look-Alikes: The More You Look, the More You See! (1998)
 Look-Alikes Jr. (1999)
 Look-Alikes Christmas (2003)
 Look-Alikes Around the World (2007)
 Look-Alikes: Seek-and-Search Puzzles (2011)

Awards and recognition 

 1998: Look-Alikes - The New York Times Book Review's Notable Children's Books of 1998

Exhibitions 

 2007: Look-Alikes: The Amazing World of Joan Steiner - New York State Museum, Albany, New York
2016: I Spy with My Little Eye: Joan Steiner Look-Alikes - The Albany Institute of History & Art, Albany, New York
2017: Joan Steiner's Look-Alikes - The Albany Institute of History & Art, Albany, New York
2018: Joan Steiner's Look-Alikes - The Albany Institute of History & Art, Albany, New York

References

1943 births
2010 deaths
People from Claverack, New York
Barnard College alumni
American women illustrators
American illustrators
Deaths from cancer in New York (state)
Puzzle designers
Place of birth missing
20th-century American women artists
21st-century American women